The Let-Mont Tulak is a Czech microlight aircraft that was designed and produced by Let-Mont sro of Vikýřovice. When it was available the aircraft was supplied as a complete ready-to-fly-aircraft or a kit for amateur construction.

The aircraft was marketed in Austria and Germany under the name Amigo.

Design and development
It was also marketed in the United States as a kit only for the US homebuilt category.

The Tulak features a strut-braced high-wing, a two-seats-in-side-by-side configuration enclosed cockpit accessed via doors, fixed conventional landing gear with wheel pants and a single engine in tractor configuration.

The aircraft fuselage is made from welded steel tubing, with the whole aircraft covered in doped aircraft fabric. The standard engine used is the  Rotax 503 two-stroke and  Rotax 912 four-stroke powerplant, although a four-stroke BMW boxer engine was also available as a factory option

The manufacturer estimated the construction time from the supplied kit as 700 hours.

Operational history
By 1998 the company reported that 10 aircraft were completed and flying.

In September 2014 no examples were registered in the United States with the Federal Aviation Administration.

Specifications (Tulak)

References

External links

Tulak
1990s Czech and Czechoslovakian sport aircraft
1990s Czech and Czechoslovakian ultralight aircraft
1990s Czech and Czechoslovakian civil utility aircraft
Single-engined tractor aircraft
High-wing aircraft
Homebuilt aircraft